Vladimir Semenovich Semyonov (16 February 1911, Kirsanovsky Uyezd, Russia – 18 December 1992, Cologne, Germany) was a Soviet diplomat and famous for his military administration in Eastern Germany during the Soviet occupation after World War II. He was instrumental in the creation of GDR, and served as the first Soviet ambassador to East Germany.

Carrier of Soviet diplomat 

 1939 – employee of the  Ministry of Foreign Affairs (MID)
 1939–1940 – advisor of Soviet Plenipotentiary Representation in Lithuania
 1940–1941 – counsellor of the Soviet Embassy in Nazi Germany
 1941–1942 – executive of the Third European Department of the MID
 1942–1945 – counsellor of the Soviet Mission in Sweden
 1945–1946 – deputy of the a Political Counsellor of the Soviet Military Administration in Germany
 1946–1949 – Political Counsellor of the Soviet Military Administration in Germany
 1949–1953 – Political Counsellor of the Soviet Control Committee in Germany
 1953  — Senior Executive, Deputy Chief, Chief of the Third European Department of the Ministry of Foreign Affairs, member of Ministry Board of the MID.
 1953–1954 – Chief Commissar of USSR in Germany and an ambassador to the GDR;
 1954–1955 – Executive of the Third European Department of the Ministry of Foreign Affairs
 1955–1978 – Deputy Minister of Foreign Affairs
 1968–1978 – Chief of the Soviet delegation at the Soviet-American negotiations on reduction of strategic weapons in Helsinki, Vienna, Geneva. Prepared the 1973 SALT-1 and 1978 SALT-2 Treaties for signing by General Secretaries Leonid Brezhnev and Presidents Gerald Ford and Jimmy Carter.
 1978–1986 – USSR ambassador to West Germany
 1986–1991 – Foreign Ministry Ambassador at Large, Counsellor to the Foreign Minister

References

1911 births
1992 deaths
People from Tambov Oblast
People from Kirsanovsky Uyezd
Moscow State University alumni
Central Committee of the Communist Party of the Soviet Union candidate members
Ambassador Extraordinary and Plenipotentiary (Soviet Union)
Ambassadors of the Soviet Union to East Germany
Ambassadors of the Soviet Union to West Germany
Recipients of the Order of Lenin
Recipients of the Order of the Red Banner of Labour
Recipients of the Order of Friendship of Peoples